George Dixon Academy is a school in north Edgbaston, Birmingham, England. Former names include George Dixon Higher Grade School, George Dixon Grammar School, George Dixon Community School, George Dixon Grant Maintained School and George Dixon International School. The current headmaster is Tutvinder Mann. Former heads include Robert Dowling and Anthony Hamilton, a double gold medal paralympian.

History

George Dixon (1820–1898) was a councillor, mayor, and MP in Birmingham.  One of his first actions after being elected mayor in 1866 was to hold a conference to discuss the lack of education for children. This led to the formation of the Birmingham Education Society in 1867, and the National Education League, which he chaired, in 1869. The League in turn was instrumental in the creation of the Elementary Education Act 1870 (Forster's Act), leading to the formation of the first school boards in England and Wales.

In 1884, Dixon created Bridge Street Technical School. He bought the old Cadbury's premises, and converted it to a school at his own expense. It taught science and mechanics to 400 boys for two years beyond normal school-leaving age. In 1888 the school was moved to occupy the Oozells Street Board School building, renamed George Dixon Higher Grade School in 1888, and began to include girls.
 In 1906 the school was rebuilt and renamed once again as George Dixon School after its founder. The new school building included a gymnasium.

In 2002, headteacher Sir Robert Dowling was knighted for "services to special needs education". 
 
The school was re-modelled using funds from the Birmingham City Council's Building Schools for the Future Programme. In September 2012 the school converted to academy status and was renamed George Dixon Academy.

In popular culture
The television character Dixon of Dock Green was named after George Dixon. The character first appeared in the film The Blue Lamp (1950), produced by a former pupil of the school, Michael Balcon.

See also
:Category:People educated at George Dixon Academy
John Morris Jones Walkway, headmaster 1960–1980

References

Further reading

External links

Secondary schools in Birmingham, West Midlands
Academies in Birmingham, West Midlands